Ermenouville is a commune in the Seine-Maritime department in the Normandy region in northern France.

Geography

Population

Places of interest
 The Château d'Arnouville
 The seventeenth century Château du Mesnil-Geffroy and its park.
 The church of Notre-Dame, dating from the nineteenth century.
 The church of St. Ouen, dating from the sixteenth century.

See also
Communes of the Seine-Maritime department

References

Communes of Seine-Maritime